The Dolphin 24 is an American trailerable sailboat that was designed by William Shaw of Sparkman & Stephens as a Midget Ocean Racing Club (MORC) racer-cruiser and first built in 1959. Shaw had been one of the instigators of the MORC rules. The boat is Sparkman & Stephens' design #1497.

The design was built by a large number of manufacturers during its lengthy production run between 1959 and 1978.

Production
The design was initially sold by the O'Day Corp. in the United States, with production of 36 boats between 1959 and 1967. O'Day did not build the boat in-house, but contracted out construction to several different companies, including Lunn Laminates of Long Island, New York and later Marscot Plastics in Fall River, Massachusetts, a company that later became a subsidiary of O'Day. J.J. Taylor and Sons Ltd. in Canada also likely built some. The boat was also sold by US Yachts Inc. of Westport, Connecticut under Bob Larsen and Warren Dellenbaugh (not the same US Yachts that was a division of Bayliner), with O'Day building the boats for them. US Yachts Inc. was to go public on the New York Stock Exchange. In 1968 Yankee Yachts Inc. acquired the design rights and  started production in Inglewood, California, with few changes to the design. The hulls were actually built by O'Day, but eventually Yankee used one of the completed hulls to create its own mold. Yankee later moved to Santa Ana, California. After Yankee went out of business, one of their suppliers restarted production in Anaheim, California, under the name Pacific Dolphin, building boats from 1974 to 1978, before production ended.

Some of the boats were also sold as kits for owner completion.

Design
The Dolphin 24 derived from an earlier wooden boat design, the Mermaid 24.

The Dolphin 24 is a recreational keelboat, built predominantly of fiberglass, with wood trim. It has a masthead sloop rig, a raked stem; a raised counter, angled transom; a keel-mounted rudder controlled by a tiller and a fixed long keel, with a centerboard. It displaces  and carries  of ballast.

After a fire destroyed the deck molds, some boats were finished with wooden decks and wooden coach house roofs.

The boat is fitted with a Palmer Husky  gasoline engine for docking and maneuvering, or a small, stern well-mounted  outboard motor.

The boats built by Pacific Dolphin were  lighter, but used a fiberglass centerboard with a lead core in place of the bronze centerboard used by Yankee and O'Day. The Pacific Dolphin boats have  more ballast and an outboard well instead of the optional inboard engine.

The design has sleeping accommodation for five people, with a double "V"-berth in the bow cabin, a drop down dinette table that converts to a double berth and a small straight settee in the main cabin. The galley is located on the port side at the companionway ladder. The galley is equipped with an icebox and a sink. The head is located just aft of the bow cabin on the starboard side.

Operational history
The boat is supported by an active class club, the Dolphin 24 Class.

A review by Stephens Waring Yacht Design reported, "one a look at Olin Stephens near-perfect drawing shows why the Dolphin is such a dream to sail. She's moderately light for her time, at 4,250 pounds. Your SUV weighs more. And she can flash ample canvas: The sail area-to-displacement ratio is around 18.2, and conservative by today's standard, but she’s not at all under-canvased. These boats offer many combinations in sail power: symmetrical spinnakers, multiple jibs and overlapping genoas and everything in between. And keep in mind she only draws 2' 10" with the center-board up. Meaning for the brave and the physical, she will push her hull speed with a skilled crew; her balanced helm is easy on the hand."

See also
List of sailing boat types

References

Keelboats
1950s sailboat type designs
Sailing yachts
Trailer sailers
Sailboat type designs by Sparkman and Stephens
Sailboat type designs by William Shaw
Sailboat types built in the United States
Sailboat types built by O'Day Corp.